Kharrat Mahalleh may refer to:
 Kharrat Mahalleh, Langarud
 Kharrat Mahalleh, Sowme'eh Sara